Pinjre Ke Panchhi is a 1966 Indian Hindi-language film starring Meena Kumari, Balraj Sahni and Mehmood in lead roles. The film marks the directorial debut of ace music director Salil Chowdhury who also gave its music. It was a commercial failure at the box office.

Plot
Sonu (Abhi Bhattacharya), a patient suffering from a rare heart condition falls in love with Heena (Meena Kumari), a young nurse who treats him at the hospital. Soon after they get married, Sonu asks Heena to relocate to a small town where he has rented a house and promises to join her in few days.
On reaching the house, Heena meets Sonu's brother Lalu (Mehmood Ali), and his paternal uncle Yasin (Balraj Sahni). Days turn into weeks but Sonu never returns. However in due course Heena develops an understanding with both Lalu and Yasin.
Soon, Heena comes across a letter in which Sonu tells her to marry someone else as he may not live long enough. She also realises that the two men are actually convicts hiding in her house. When Yasin reads the letter, he brings Sonu to the house but somehow Sonu escapes and informs the police.
In the climax of the film, Yasin and Lalu manage to take Heena, whose condition has by now worsened, to the hospital. By the time they reach hospital, Yasin is shot dead by the police and the others unite with Sonu.

Background
On 5 March 1964, during the mahurat of this film, Meena Kumari was allegedly hit by Baqar Ali, Kamal Amrohi's assistant for allowing Gulzar to enter her make-up room. When Meena Kumari asked Kamal Amrohi to intervene and come to the studio, he refused and asked her to come back. Enraged, Meena Kumari left Kamal Amrohi's house and never returned.

Cast
 Meena Kumari as Heena Sharma
 Balraj Sahni as Yasin Khan
 Mehmood Ali as Lalu
 Abhi Bhattacharya as Sushobhan "Sonu" Sharma
 Shaukat Azmi
 Persis Khambatta (credited as Ms. Poonam) as Amy
 Keshto Mukherjee
 Asit Sen
 Harindranath Chattopadhyay

Crew
Director – Salil Chowdhury
Producer – M. C. Ananthraj	
Story – Salil Chowdhury
Dialogues – Gulzar
Screenplay – Salil Chowdhury
Cinematography	– Kamal Bose
Music – Salil Chowdhury
Lyrics – Shailendra, Gulzar
Editing – Hrishikesh Mukherjee
Art Direction – Sudhendu Roy
Playback Singers – Manna Dey, Lata Mangeshkar, Asha Bhosle

Soundtrack
The film had five songs in it. The music of the film was composed by Salil Chowdhury. Shailendra and Gulzar wrote the lyrics.

 "Manzil Teri Khoj Mein" - Lata Mangeshkar. Lyrics by: Shailendra
 "Aisa Hoga" - Manna Dey, Meena Kumari. Lyrics by: Gulzar
 "Jhoom Le Jhoom Le" - Asha Bhosle. Lyrics by: Shailendra
 "Mere Nayan Paakhi Bechare" - Lata Mangeshkar. Lyrics by: Shailendra
 "Nicha Kaam Uncha Naam" - Manna Dey. Lyrics by: Shailendra

References

Bibliography

External links
 

1966 films
1960s Hindi-language films